Neelamperoor Pally Bhagavathi Temple is a 1700 year old Buddhist temple in Kerala, India situated in kuttanadu Alappuzha.  It is about 3 km west of Kurichy outpost in Kottayam-Changanacherry Main Central Road. The principal deity is Vanadurga (Durga or Kali).

Image Gallery

References 

Buddhist temples in India
Buddhist sites in Kerala

Bhagavathi temples in Kerala
Hindu temples in Kottayam district